Joan Peers (August 19, 1909 – July 11, 1975) was an American stage and film actress. She enjoyed a brief spell as a Hollywood star and is perhaps best known for her role in Rouben Mamoulian's burlesque-set melodrama Applause in 1929.

Filmography
 Applause (1929)
 Rain or Shine (1930)
 Tol'able David (1930)
 Paramount on Parade (1930)
 Around the Corner (1930)
 Anybody's War (1930)
 The Tip-Off (1931)
 Parlor, Bedroom and Bath (1931)
 Over the Hill (1931)

References

Bibliography
 Hillier, Jim & Pye, Doug. 100 Film Musicals. Palgrave Macmillan, 2011.
 Milne, Tom. Rouben Mamoulian. Indiana University Press, 1970.

External links

1909 births
1975 deaths
American film actresses
American stage actresses
People from Chicago
20th-century American actresses